Dreamland is a private urban development located approximately  west of Egypt's capital city, Cairo. It is located in the newly constructed 6 October City which is surrounded mostly by desert and arid plains, linked to the main city by a ring road and the 26 July Freeway. The development provides many recreational and commercial facilities and is home to a variety of shopping complexes, sport and entertainment facilities, business hubs, luxury resorts, prime real estate and theme parks. Dreamland is aimed at a specific demographic and mainly attracts wealthy locals, expatriates and international visitors. The construction of Dreamland began in 1995 and was inspired by contemporary western urbanism and in particular the private developments in the United States of America around the mid-twentieth century. The project was fueled by neo-liberal capitalism and mass consumerism and upon completion, it was estimated to cost more than US$200 million. The development was instigated by the Bahgat Group and masterminded by its chairman, an influential Egyptian entrepreneur, Ahmed Bahgat.

History

Dreamland was a Middle Eastern galvanization of the gated community, a new movement in urban planning and development which became prevalent in Cairo from the 1960s onward. The gated community was one where residential real-estate was tightly controlled through guarded entrances bordered by fences or walls, shared common amenities such as tennis courts and pools and the provision of security to protect its residents (Low, 2001). These neighbourhoods were generally built and designed for particular demographics and they often garnished the reputation for being exclusive communities who were controlled and regulated by private corporations. In his article, Dreamland: The Neo-liberalism of Your Desires, Mitchell argues that developments which boast these levels of exclusivity and purpose such as Dreamland are undisciplined and irresponsible planning practices and that their exclusive nature caters only for the ‘super-rich’ minorities (1999). In Egypt, these private developments are only financially accessible to less than 5% of the total population (Mitchell, 1998).

Private developments in Egypt in the mid to late twentieth century tended to be inspired by European influences and American consumerism (Elsheshtawy, 2004). Around Cairo there are many local examples of similar luxury developments such as Hyde Park, located in New Cairo which boasts prestigious Italian-style villas, and Rivoli which is modeled around elegant Parisian architecture. The late twentieth century saw Egyptians gradually becoming saturated with dominant symbols of American wealth and success and this facilitated a shift toward the promotion of a certain lifestyle in which Egyptians saw as encapsulating wealth and prosperity (Adham, 2004). This gave rise in the Middle East, and particularly Egypt, to many developments based on the perceived Western lifestyle model of success. Mega-scale shopping malls, theme parks, fast food chains and luxury resorts began to invade the desert landscape as Egypt welcomed a new period of change in urban development.

The Developers

The Bahgat group, are a far reaching Middle Eastern corporation who play a highly influential role in the commercial economy of Egypt. Along with coordinating the construction of Dreamland, the company is well known for pioneering internet service provision and is the largest producer of televisions in the Middle East (Mitchell, 1999). The Bahgat Group contracted two North American companies to design and develop their project. The Development Design Group Inc. was responsible for creating the master plan, whilst the Toronto-based company FORREC, who designed Universal Studios in California, was in charge of designing the Dreampark, the theme park within the Dreamland complex. Both of these companies boasted extensive experience with developments in the Middle East and the strategic choice of outsourcing the design and development of the master plan to two foreign North American companies, ensured that the project would be infused with Western influences and models.

The unstable economic times of the late twentieth century in Egypt lead to the liberalization of the market which resulted in many laws and government policies being overturned from the socialist reign (Adham, 2004). This affected public and private developments significantly and allowed more flexibility and accessibility for land to be purchased by private developers. In an attempt to ease housing inequalities, raise capital and prevent urban sprawl, the Egyptian government sold vast pockets of land to private developers, however this eventuated in the widening of the housing equality gap leading to increased populations of displaced low-income earners being dominated by the much smaller minority of higher income, wealthy locals.

Facilities
As mentioned previously, Dreamland is modeled around the Western paradigm of success and in the planning of Dreamland, the developers incorporated a theme park, Dreampark which was to be the Middle-Eastern interpretation of the successful American Disneyland chains. The developers recognised Disneyland as not only an important defining pinnacle of Western affluence and success but also as a primary source of capital growth.  Dreampark is home to many rides, attractions, restaurants and shopping outlets and is described by its official website as ‘the leading amusement park of the Middle East’ (www.dreamparkegypt.com). As well as an entertainment park with luxury hotels and apartment complexes, Dreamland is also largely a residential estate with the general basic amenities of any community such as several schools, a hospital, sports clubs and places of worship including two mosques and a church.

Criticisms
Dreamland, according to Hannigan, (1998) controls and organizes people into patterns of consumerism and lifestyle that is fueled by entertainment and capitalism. It is criticized for failing to capture a sense of community and having no defined central core to bind its residents together. It is organized, or rather disorganized into a haphazard jungle of mixed uses with the sole intention of profiteering and consumption. Dreamland is, according to Adham ‘designed solely for consumption and fun’ (2004).  Dreamland is essentially an exclusive, self-contained sub-city within the wider region of Cairo and the premise of its construction is very much in accordance to Ritzer's theory of McDonaldization in which big American symbols ‘are coming to dominate more and more sectors of American society as well as the rest of the world ‘(2008). In this case, Dreamland is based on the representation of these ideals and in creating these gated communities which are exclusive to only those who can afford it, private developments in Egypt and the Middle East will continue to be the catalyst for social inequity and further promote mass consumerism and consumption based on the idealistic and symbolic perceptions of American and Western prosperity.

Dreamland was also marketed as a technologically advanced residential compound, with a complete fibre-optic network and fast internet connectivity. Although planned as such, the reality is that internet connectivity is leased from a third party ISP, and then distributed to residents by Dreamland itself. Dreamland does not adhere to market pricing for internet in Egypt (as of 2012, Dreamland sells a 2Mbit/sec connection for over L.E. 300, about L.E. 100 more than all other ISPs. And due to the limited bandwidth, if a user wishes to connect at speeds any higher than 4Mbit/sec, Dreamland would charge exorbitant and unreasonable prices). The only advantage is that Dreamland also does not adhere to the "fair usage policy" of other Egyptian ISPs, meaning there is no monthly bandwidth quota after which speeds would drop. This is, however, offset by the fact that technical service and support is sub par and speeds are inconsistent (for long periods of time a subscriber might receive less than half the purchased speed, and technical support would deny that the reason is shared bandwidth), due to the limited bandwidth Dreamland leases and subsequently sells to more than the reasonable number of users that the leased bandwidth can sustain.
As of 10 July 2014, the Internet service in Dreamland has been down, with very bad customer support handling the lack of Internet situation.

See also
 6th October City
 Sheikh Zayed City
 Greater Cairo

References

Adham, K. (2004) ‘Cairo’s Urban Déjà vu: Globalization and Urban Fantasies’ in Y. 
Elsheshtawy  (ed), Planning Middle Eastern Cities (pp. 261–273), New York, USA: Routledge.

Bahgat Group (2010) Dreampark, www.bahgat.com/dpages.aspx?id=121. Accessed May 7, 2011.

Elsheshtawy, Y. (2004) ‘The Middle East City: Moving beyond the Narrative of Loss’ in Y. Elsheshtawy  (ed), Planning Middle Eastern Cities (pp261–273), New York, USA: Routledge.

Ghannam, F. (2008) ‘Two Dreams in a Global City: Class and Space in Urban Egypt’ in A Huyssen (ed), Other Cities, Other Worlds (pp. 267–288), United States of America: Duke University Press.

Low, S. (2001) ‘The Edge and the Centre: Gated Communities and the Discourse of Urban Fear.’ American Anthropologist, Vol. 103 (1) p. 45-58.

Mitchell, T. (1999) ‘Dreamland: The Neolibralism of Your Desires.’ Middle East Report, Vol. 210 pp. 28–33: Middle East Research and Information Project

Ritzer, G. (2008) The McDonaldization of Society, New York, United States of America: Pine Forge Press.

6th of October (city)